Six Mile Bottom railway station is a disused railway station on the Ipswich to Cambridge line between  and . It served the village of Six Mile Bottom, until closure in January 1967. The station buildings and one platform remain as a private residence. Although the station is closed, the line remains in use by trains between Ipswich and Cambridge.

They had also commenced work on a line that would link Six Mile Bottom to Cambridge after which the company then intended to extend further with a line to Thetford which would give a more direct route to Norwich. The Eastern Counties Railway (ECR) who operated trains via Cambridge to Norwich were not happy with this and put pressure on the Newmarket Railway leading them to cease trading in June 1850.

However, under the leadership of bankruptcy commissioner Cecil Fane, the company was re-established in September of the same year and instead the line from Six Mile Bottom to Cambridge was completed using the track from the Chesterford – Six Mile Bottom section. This line then opened on 9 October 1851 and the Chesterford route was closed.

References

Disused railway stations in Cambridgeshire
Former Great Eastern Railway stations
Railway stations in Great Britain opened in 1848
Railway stations in Great Britain closed in 1967